Babubhai Maneklal Chinai (1913-1975) was an Indian politician. He was a Member of Parliament  representing Maharashtra in the Rajya Sabha the upper house of India's Parliament. He was awarded India's third highest civilian honour the Padma Bhushan in 1966.

References

1975 deaths
1913 births
Rajya Sabha members from Maharashtra